This is a list of all cricketers who have played first-class or List A cricket for South Zone cricket team.

Last updated at the end of the 2015/16 season.

A–F

 Mohammad Abdul Hai
 Jayasoorya Abhiram
 Syed Abid Ali
 Alfred Absolem
 Linganatha Adisesh
 Mayank Agarwal
 Fayaz Ahmed
 Ghulam Ahmed
 Habib Ahmed
 Shoaib Ahmed
 Edulji Aibara
 Neravanda Aiyappa
 Shahid Akbar
 Balachandra Akhil
 Asghar Ali
 Bellipadi Chandrahasa Alva
 A. Ananthanarayanan
 K. N. Ananthapadmanabhan
 Anirudh Singh
 K. P. Appanna
 Baba Aparajith
 Sreenath Aravind
 Bharat Arun
 Jagadeesh Arunkumar
 P. R. Ashokanand
 Ravichandran Ashwin
 Swapnil Asnodkar
 Arshad Ayub
 Abdul Azeem
 Mohammad Azharuddin
 Sachin Baby
 Hemang Badani
 Subramaniam Badrinath
 Abbas Ali Baig
 Lakshmipathy Balaji
 Saurabh Bandekar
 P. K. Belliappa
 Vijay Bharadwaj
 C. K. Bhaskaran
 Raghuram Bhat
 Roger Binny
 Stuart Binny
 D. L. Chakravarti
 V. Chamundeswaranath
 B. S. Chandrasekhar
 V. B. Chandrasekhar
 Raghunath Chinnadorai
 Bharat Chipli
 Michael Dalvi
 Noel David
 D. B. Deodhar
 Sanjay Desai
 Dinshaw Doctor
 Rahul Dravid
 Benjamin Frank

G–L

 C. Ganapathy
 Dodda Ganesh
 C. M. Gautam
 Narayanan Gautam
 Mohammed Ghazali
 Jugal Kishore Ghiya
 Roy Gilchrist
 D. J. Gokulakrishnan
 Shreyas Gopal
 M. J. Gopalan
 C. D. Gopinath
 Devraj Govindraj
 Rajaram Gurav
 Ali Hussain
 Zakir Hussain
 Asif Iqbal
 Abdul Jabbar
 Arati Jagannath
 M. L. Jaisimha
 Vivek Jaisimha
 Shadab Jakati
 Govindamenon Jayakumar
 Kenia Jayantilal
 Arani Jayaprakash
 Kartik Jeshwant
 Rajamani Jesuraj
 David Johnson
 Conrad Johnstone
 Sunil Joshi
 Saad Bin Jung
 P. Jyothiprasad
 Doddapaneni Kalyankrishna
 Kommireddi Kamaraju
 Dayanand Kamath
 Narayan Kambli
 K. S. Kannan
 N. Kannayiram
 Kanwaljit Singh
 Aashish Kapoor
 Arun Karthik
 Dinesh Karthik
 Gopalaswamy Kasturirangan
 Jagannathan Kaushik
 Kamraj Kesari
 Ibrahim Khaleel
 Habib Khan
 Mansur Ali Khan
 Nizam Yar Khan
 Waheed Yar Khan
 Bharat Khanna
 Ranjit Khanwilkar
 Syed Kirmani
 Nand Kishore
 A. G. Kripal Singh
 Trichy Krishna
 Pochiah Krishnamurthy
 Ajjampur Krishnaswamy
 V. Krishnaswamy
 Ajay Kudua
 Arvind Kumar
 Bharath Kumar
 Mahendra Kumar
 Sarvesh Kumar
 Mani Suresh Kumar
 Vaman Kumar
 Vinay Kumar
 Thiru Kumaran
 Anil Kumble
 Budhi Kunderan
 V. V. S. Laxman

M–R

 Jayaraman Madanagopal
 Rangachari Madhavan
 Nekkanti Madhukar
 Sadagoppan Mahesh
 Yo Mahesh
 S. V. S. Mani
 Daniel Manohar
 Dinesh Medh
 Daitala Meherbaba
 Naushir Mehta
 A. G. Milkha Singh
 Darshan Misal
 Abhimanyu Mithun
 Vijay Mohanraj
 Ronit More
 Abhinav Mukund
 P. Mukund
 M. K. Murugesh
 Gopi Naidu
 Thilak Naidu
 Korra Naik
 Karun Nair
 Sreekumar Nair
 Narender Pal Singh
 Salus Nazareth
 Sunil Oasis
 Pragyan Ojha
 Phiroze Palia
 Manish Pandey
 Balan Pandit
 Prasanth Parameswaran
 Mansur Ali Khan Pataudi
 Brijesh Patel
 Yogendra Patel
 Amit Pathak
 Reuben Paul
 Vijay Paul
 K. B. Pawan
 Namdev Phadte
 Kiran Powar
 P. C. Prakash
 M. S. K. Prasad
 Venkatesh Prasad
 Chandramouli Prasad
 E. A. S. Prasanna
 Ramaswamy Prasanna
 Vanka Pratap
 Rohan Prem
 Khalid Qayyum
 Chandrashekhar Raghu
 K. L. Rahul
 Mohan Rai
 K. R. Rajagopal
 Venkatapathy Raju
 Woorkeri Raman
 C. J. Ramdev
 P. Ramesh
 Sadagoppan Ramesh
 Hanumara Ramkishen
 Ramakrishnan Ramkumar
 Venkatraman Ramnarayan
 B. Ramprakash
 Hanumara Ramprasad
 A. G. Ram Singh
 C. R. Rangachari
 Srinivas Rangaraj
 Malolan Rangarajan
 Balaji Rao
 Hejmadi Bhaskar Rao
 M. V. Narasimha Rao
 U. Prabhakar Rao
 Rama Rao
 Sanjiva Rao
 Sharad Rao
 Sudhakar Rao
 Venkatesh Rao
 Yalaka Venugopal Rao
 Yaleeka Gnaneswara Rao
 Mirza Ravikumar
 Dwaraka Ravi Teja
 Ambati Rayudu
 Vivek Razdan
 Akshath Reddy
 Ashish Reddy
 Bharath Reddy
 Inder Shekar Reddy
 Kaushik Reddy
 Prasad Reddy
 Madhusudan Rege
 Robin Singh
 Barrington Rowland

S–Z

 Syed Sahabuddin
 Manoj Sai
 K. Sainath
 Carlton Saldanha
 Sanju Samson
 Wasuderao Sane
 A. K. Sarangapani
 Ganesh Satish
 A. G. Satwender Singh
 T. A. Sekhar
 M. Senthilnathan
 HS Sharath
 Sridharan Sharath
 Sadu Shinde
 Mumbai Shrinivas
 Poll Shyamsunder
 Laxman Sivaramakrishnan
 Venkataraman Sivaramakrishnan
 Vidyut Sivaramakrishnan
 Ranga Sohoni
 Shiraguppi Somasekhar
 Sujith Somasunder
 S. Sreesanth
 M. V. Sridhar
 Ramakrishnan Sridhar
 Anirudha Srikkanth
 Kris Srikkanth
 Javagal Srinath
 Krishnaraj Srinath
 Aushik Srinivas
 Krishnaswami Srinivasan
 M. O. Srinivasan
 Muthuswami Srinivasan
 T. E. Srinivasan
 M. R. Srinivasaprasad
 Sridharan Sriram
 CV Stephen
 Linganath Subbu
 Sunil Subramaniam
 Venkataraman Subramanya
 Bodavarapu Sudhakar
 Bodapati Sumanth
 Maripuri Suresh
 Somasetty Suresh
 C. S. Sureshkumar
 M. Suryanarayan
 Narain Swamy
 R. A. Swaroop
 T. Thimmiah
 Gordon Upjohn
 Robin Uthappa
 Avinash Vaidya
 Sunil Valson
 Ajay Varma
 Diwakar Vasu
 Santhanaraman Vasudevan
 S. Venkataraghavan
 M. Venkataramana
 Amit Verma
 Hanuma Vihari
 Murali Vijay
 B. Vijayakrishna
 Paidikalva Vijaykumar
 V. S. Vijay Kumar
 Devishetty Vinay Kumar
 Sankinani Vishnuvardhan
 Gundappa Viswanath
 Kadur Viswanath
 Puttanna Viswanath
 Sadanand Viswanath
 Sandeep Warrier
 Hemal Watekar
 Arjun Yadav
 Rajesh Yadav
 Shivlal Yadav
 Tinu Yohannan
 Youraj Singh

References

South Zone cricketers